Stevie Meyer is a South African rugby league player for the Bloemfontein Roosters. His position is loose forward. He is a South African international, and has played in the 2013 Rugby League World Cup qualifying against Jamaica and the USA.

References

South African rugby league players
South Africa national rugby league team players
Bloemfontein Roosters players
Rugby league locks
Year of birth missing (living people)
Living people